Huayucachi District is one of twenty-eight districts of the province Huancayo in Peru.

References